Diego Veronelli (born 5 December 1979) is a former professional tennis player from Argentina.

Career
Veronelli was a quarter-finalist in the 2003 Campionati Internazionali di Sicilia. He upset second seed Nikolay Davydenko in the opening round and then had a win over Victor Hanescu. In the quarter-finals he was defeated by Paul-Henri Mathieu.

He and partner Federico Browne were doubles runners-up at Buenos Aires in 2004. The wild card entrants beat both the second and third seeds en route to the final.

The Buenos Aires born player was a member of the Argentine team which won the 2010 World Team Cup. His only appearance in the campaign came after the title was secured, with he and Eduardo Schwank losing a dead rubber to Bob and Mike Bryan.

In 2013 he was married to Susana Gonzalez and had a baby, Mateo Verronelli. Now he is tennis trainer all over the world.

ATP career finals

Doubles: 1 (0–1)

Notes

References

External links
 
 

1979 births
Living people
Argentine male tennis players
Tennis players from Buenos Aires
21st-century Argentine people